Wendell Ladner (October 6, 1948 – June 24, 1975) was an American professional basketball player most notable for his playing time in the American Basketball Association (ABA) from 1970 to 1975.

Ladner was born in Necaise Crossing, Hancock County, Mississippi and played high school ball at Hancock North Central High School in Kiln, Mississippi. After attending the University of Southern Mississippi, Ladner went undrafted in the 1970 ABA draft where he played five seasons with five different teams in the ABA, from 1970 to 1975. A  and  forward, Ladner was one of the great "enforcers" of the American Basketball Association, protecting Dan Issel of the Kentucky Colonels and Julius Erving of the New York Nets. Ladner regularly squared off with arguably the fiercest player in the ABA, Pittsburgh's John Brisker, once marching into the Condors' locker room and yelling, "Hey, John, you wanna fight right now or wait for the game?" (It was not unusual for Brisker and Ladner to beat each other bloody on the court, only to hang out together at a local bar afterwards.)  

Ladner was named to the 1971 ABA All-Rookie team, and selected to the ABA all-star game his rookie season. That year, on January 24, he set a career-high points total of 34 in a Memphis win over The Floridians. He was also an all-star the following season.

Ladner died at the age of 26 in the June 24, 1975, crash of Eastern Air Lines Flight 66. He was identified by medical examiners because he was wearing his ABA championship ring. For many years, the Nets included his name and number in their list of retired numbers, though Ladner's no. 4 did not hang in the rafters with the other retired numbers. His number was also given to Rick Mahorn during his tenure with the Nets. In October 2013, a New York Daily News article explained that the number was never formally retired. However, out of respect to Ladner, Nets trainer Fritz Massmann had not issued No. 4 to other players for 17 years after Ladner's death.

Erving called Ladner his wackiest teammate because he wanted to be Burt Reynolds with a basketball. Semi-Pro, a basketball comedy set in the 1970s and starring Will Ferrell, spoofs Ladner's Burt Reynolds persona in its trailer.

Ladner also has a road in Perkinston, Mississippi, named after him in his honor.

See also
List of basketball players who died during their careers

References

External links
ABA statistics at Basketball Reference

 Jim O'Brien: Wendell Ladner

1948 births
1975 deaths
Accidental deaths in New York (state)
American men's basketball players
Basketball players from Mississippi
Carolina Cougars players
Kentucky Colonels players
Memphis Pros players
Memphis Tams players
New York Nets players
People from Hancock County, Mississippi
Small forwards
Southern Miss Golden Eagles basketball players
Victims of aviation accidents or incidents in 1975
Victims of aviation accidents or incidents in the United States